SC Neusiedl am See 1919 are an Austrian association football club founded in 1919 and currently playing in the Austrian Regional League East.

They were relegated from the country's top tier after finishing last in the 1983–84 Austrian Football Bundesliga.

Current squad

 (on loan from Floridsdorfer AC)

Coaching staff

External links

Club logo

Association football clubs established in 1919
Football clubs in Austria
SC Neusiedl am See 1919